The Texas Highway Patrol is a division of the Texas Department of Public Safety and is the largest state-level law enforcement agency in the U.S. state of Texas. The patrol's primary duties are enforcement of state traffic laws and commercial vehicle regulation, but it is a fully empowered police agency with authority to enforce criminal law anywhere in the state. Highway patrol troopers are also responsible for patrolling the state Capitol Complex in Austin and providing security to the governor. The current Chief is Lieutenant Colonel Dwight Mathis.

The highway patrol was founded in 1929 as the Highway Motor Patrol, the first statewide law enforcement agency in Texas since the establishment of the Texas Rangers in 1823, and the first such force to be uniformed and regularly trained. Since 1935, the agency has operated under its current name. Since its inception with just 60 officers, then known as "inspectors", the Texas Highway Patrol has grown to meet the increasing volume of vehicular traffic on Texas roads, modern security threats, and the requirements of twenty-first century policing, currently employing over 2,800 sworn troopers.

The Texas Department of Public Safety (DPS), and by extension the Highway Patrol, is Texas's de facto state police.

History 

Early law enforcement in Texas began with the establishment of the Texas Rangers in 1823 by Stephen F. Austin. The Rangers were originally formed to protect American settlers from Indian attacks, and over the years transformed into a paramilitary force. Rangers fought in the Texas Revolution, Mexican–American War, and Civil War. They quickly developed an international reputation for their exploits and perceived fearlessness (Mexican soldiers nicknamed them "Texas Devils" for their scouting and fighting abilities). From 1823 to 1845, they were a territorial force made up of volunteers charged with fighting Native Americans, guarding the Mexican border, and capturing thieves, murderers, and other criminals, occasionally by controversial methods. Nonetheless, it was not until the latter stages of the 19th century and the Texas cattle boom that the Rangers took on a law enforcement, rather than frontier militia, role.

From 1845 (when Texas was annexed to the United States) until the early 20th century, the Rangers were the only form of state law enforcement available. The force was temporarily disbanded by the federal government after the Civil War, and replaced with the short-lived Texas State Police. This agency lasted only three years before the Texas Rangers were reorganized. Until the introduction of the automobile, they remained the only state criminal law enforcement agency in Texas.

The Texas Highway Patrol was established in 1929 as the Texas Highway Motor Patrol, tasked with enforcing traffic laws on Texas roads. The original force was made up of about 60 officers who patrolled on motorcycles, often in pairs. Because of this, it was not uncommon for troopers to drive criminals to jail in the offenders' own cars, then return later for the motorcycle left on the side of the road. When the Texas Department of Public Safety was formed in 1935, the Highway Motor Patrol was transferred into that department and was renamed the Texas Highway Patrol. The use of motorcycles was phased out after World War II, and cars became troopers' main mode of transportation. Two-way radio and teletype were also added in the late 1940s, allowing troopers to communicate with regional dispatch centers. The Aviation Unit was established in 1949 with the purchase of a single-engine aircraft based in Austin.

The 1960s saw some advances in technology, such as radar speed detection. Nevertheless, troopers' work was still mostly based on instinct and visual detection, and was often very hazardous. High-speed pursuits of bootleggers were common, and troopers were required to act as "storm chasers" for the National Weather Service because of the limited weather radar at the time. Motorcycles were introduced again in the 1970s, but the idea was quickly abandoned when the bikes proved unreliable.

Modern troopers use highly sophisticated technology to conduct their duties. GPS lets regional dispatch centers identify a patrol unit's exact location, and in-car computers (Mobile Data Terminals) allow troopers to receive knowledge of a person's background before ever approaching a vehicle. Troopers are increasingly armed with less-lethal weaponry, such as Tasers. The highway patrol was also one of the first agencies in Texas to use digital citation printers en masse. These systems, mounted in the patrol car, allow traffic citations to be largely completed by scanning an offender's identification card into the Mobile Data Terminal. This innovation allows for quicker ticket writing and more legible citations.

As of 2021, the Texas Highway Patrol employs 2,802 sworn troopers; this is an increase of almost 30% from the 2,162 troopers employed in 2014. Despite the size of the highway patrol and its unique name and function, however, many Texans refer to troopers simply as "DPS", referencing the THP's parent agency. Some are unaware that an entity by the name of "Texas Highway Patrol" even exists, or is distinct from its parent.

Organization 

The Texas Highway Patrol is divided into seven regions and nineteen districts. Historically, these regions were numbered I-VII, but were assigned geographic nomenclature in 2018 in order to facilitate easier identification by the public.

 North Texas Region: Garland
 District A: Dallas
 District B: Tyler
 District C: Mount Pleasant
 District D: Hurst
 Southeast Texas Region: Houston
 District A: Houston
 District B: Beaumont
 District C: Conroe
 District D: Bryan
 South Texas Region: McAllen
 District A: Weslaco
 District B: Laredo
 District C: Corpus Christi
 District D: McAllen
 West Texas Region: El Paso
 District A: Midland
 District B: El Paso
 Northwest Texas Region: Lubbock
 District A: Lubbock
 District B: Amarillo
 District C: Abilene
 Central Texas Region: San Antonio
 District A: San Antonio
 District B: Austin
 District C: Waco
 Capitol Region: Austin

Further division is complex. Districts are divided into two or three sub-districts, each overseen by one or more lieutenants. These are then divided even further into patrol areas encompassing one or two counties, depending on size and population; troopers are assigned to specific counties. Sergeants are responsible for these patrol areas. Captains oversee districts, and majors oversee regions.

Training 
Trainees are housed at DPS headquarters in Austin and receive training both there and at a driving and firing range in Williamson County, north of Austin. Academies are paramilitary in nature and are physically and mentally demanding. Academies are styled as Class A/B-(Year), and last anywhere from 18 to 28 weeks. On average, two academies are held per year; this number can be altered by the Texas DPS director as necessary, and has been as high as four per year as recently as 2017. Hands-on material covered includes weapons training, accident investigation, self-defense, pursuit driving, and intense physical readiness. Classroom study, such as fraudulent document recognition and legal and ethics code study, also plays a large role in cadets' training. Due to the difficult nature of the academy, some classes have graduated fewer than 20% of the starting number. Class A-2021, which graduated July 30, 2021, was the largest academy in THP history, with 145 recruits ultimately being commissioned.

Trainees are allowed to select a duty assignment from a list of available stations throughout the state, although the Texas DPS makes the ultimate decision on troopers' stations. Priority in assigning posts is typically given to married cadets, but most trainees nonetheless receive their requested assignments. Troopers are typically allowed to request a station transfer after one year of satisfactory service. With the creation of 250 new authorized assignments along the Texas-Mexico border in 2017, many of them in remote locations such as Sanderson, Marfa, and Pecos, it has since become routine for the majority of new Troopers to be assigned to border stations, replacing predecessors who had likewise been stationed there upon graduating the academy and then transferred after one year.

Duties
Texas state troopers perform a number of law enforcement duties and tasks:

 Enforce state traffic laws by patrolling the highways and issuing citations to violators.
 Arrest drunk drivers, wanted felons, and other criminals, especially during enforcement blitzes.
 Respond to, investigate, and report on traffic accidents in rural areas.
 Provide security to the state capitol complex and governor.
 Inspect commercial vehicles for load and driver fatigue violations.
 Assist other DPS divisions with felony investigations, such as narcotics smuggling.
 Educate citizens on traffic safety practices such as child safety seats and proper vehicle maintenance.
 Provide statewide criminal law enforcement, especially in rural areas where local police are limited.
 Participate in selective specialized units, such as regional SWAT teams, marine patrol, and dive recovery.

Variation, Specialization, and Changes

General Law Enforcement

Although the highway patrol's primary task is enforcement of state traffic laws, many remote areas of the state require troopers to serve general policing duties because of limited local law enforcement. These duties may include responding to civilian calls for service, serving warrants, patrolling the U.S.-Mexico border, conducting investigations, and other responsibilities.

In other areas, troopers provide assistance to other law enforcement agencies, such as United States Customs and Border Protection, Texas State Game Wardens, and various local and county police entities.

Notwithstanding these duties, the Texas Administrative Code (which codifies operations of state agencies) officially considers traffic patrol and accident investigation in rural, unincorporated areas the priority of the highway patrol.

Special Units

 Tactical Marine: Consists of six armed patrol vessels used to interdict drug traffickers and human smugglers along the Rio Grande and combat violent Mexican drug cartels
 Bicycle Patrol: The Bicycle Patrol Unit operates within the Capitol Region. Its mission is to take a proactive stance in deterring criminal activity; traffic enforcement through arrests, citations, and written warnings; educate the public in traffic and crime prevention; and apply community policing concepts to those working in and visiting the State Capitol Complex.
 Motor Unit: The unit began as an experiment in July 2011; now a fully functioning unit with Troopers assigned to the State Capitol Complex. The Motor Unit is responsible for assignments such as crime suppression, tactical operations, community engagements, traffic control, and escorts.
 Mounted Horse Patrol: The unit was established in 2014 to patrol the State Capitol Complex. The mission of the MHPU is to enhance community policing efforts by providing a positive interaction for those visiting the Capitol Complex. The unit also provides a highly visible and effective patrol and security function in suppressing civil disturbances, as well as deterring terrorism and criminal activity.
 Dive Recovery: Consists of several SCUBA-certified troopers from throughout the state who specialize in recovering evidence, deceased persons, and other items from waterways and lakes
 Special Response Teams: Specially trained tactical teams based in each highway patrol region, troopers and criminal investigators serve high-risk warrants and assist in hostage and barricaded subject scenarios
 K-9: Consists of several troopers throughout the state who handle dogs trained to detect illegal substances and apprehend dangerous fugitives

Border Operations

Operation Strong Safety 

From 2014 to 2017, the Texas Highway Patrol participated in Operation Strong Safety, a program intended to increase law enforcement along the Texas-Mexico border. The patrol's role in Operation Strong Safety (OSS) was to deploy large numbers of troopers to the border in order to add an increased deterrent to drug traffickers and human smugglers. The plan called for troopers from across the state to serve approximately one week each patrolling border counties, particularly in South Texas; deployments rotated constantly to maintain a steady presence along the border. OSS was the successor to previous similar efforts, such as Operation Border Star, and was approved by the Texas Legislature with an $800 million price tag.

These deployments of large numbers of troopers were criticized by some. Many troopers complained about participating in the operation, and others were injured during pursuits and struggles with Mexican cartels. Between January 2005 and June 2009, Hidalgo County troopers were involved in 656 vehicle pursuits - 30 times the average for troopers in other counties - with only about 40% of suspects being apprehended. Some experts also questioned the patrol's aggressive pursuit tactics, which often involve shooting out the tires of fleeing vehicles and performing roadblock techniques. Controversy about the role of firearms in pursuits arose in October 2012 after a THP sharpshooter in a helicopter opened fire on a suspected drug smuggler, accidentally killing two illegal immigrants who were concealed within the vehicle.

In 2015, the Dallas Morning News reported that the constant rotation of troopers from across the state to the border appeared to be responsible for a significant drop in DPS productivity elsewhere in Texas. Highway Patrol troopers reportedly wrote 14% fewer traffic citations in 2014 than in 2013; this and other statistics, such as a 25% decrease in arrests made by Texas Rangers, led the newspaper to conclude that the temporary removal of troopers and other state law enforcement officers from posts around the state was having a detrimental effect on overall DPS service. The agency has sought to control this issue by increasing the number of troopers and agents permanently assigned to the border.

Despite some criticism, Operation Strong Safety and similar efforts have seen several large seizures of illegal drugs being trafficked from Mexico. In many cases, seizures of drug profits and weapons being transported south across the border have also been recovered, along with numerous vehicles, many of them stolen. Law enforcement presence in many border counties has dramatically increased as well. Hidalgo County, for example, tripled its DPS station from 20 to 60 permanently assigned troopers during Operation Border Star, the predecessor to OSS; this number has since risen to over 90. No troopers or other DPS officers have been killed while participating in the operations. Texas DPS announced it was no longer rotating troopers to the border in September 2017.

Operation Lone Star 

In March 2021, Texas Governor Greg Abbott announced the commencement of Operation Lone Star, a DPS initiative to combat human and narcotics trafficking on the Texas border with Mexico. The operation, which is ongoing as of August 2021 and has no set end date, involves deployment of approximately 1,000 Texas DPS personnel, Texas National Guardsmen, and law enforcement from other states to the Mexican border in response to record numbers of illegal crossings. Within two months of the start of Operation Lone Star, DPS reported that its troopers and agents had made over 600 criminal apprehensions - including a DPS Top 10 Most Wanted fugitive - and referred over 24,000 illegal migrants to the U.S. Border Patrol; by late July 2021, arrests stood at 3,400 and immigrant referrals at 53,000. According to one media source, troopers assigned to Operation Lone Star have occasionally been required to work 14-hour shifts for as many as 15 days in a row.

Operation Lone Star quickly stirred political controversy and criticisms similar to Operation Strong Safety: in some areas, local law enforcement acknowledged they were having to adjust their staffing in order to compensate for a lack of Highway Patrol troopers in their area, and the U.S. Justice Department threatened in July 2021 to sue the State of Texas over some elements of the operation. The Texas Tribune criticized Abbott's instruction that troopers arrest illegal migrants on state charges such as trespassing, and some South Texas residents expressed concern that the influx of troopers would lead to an increase in traffic stops of locals.

Dallas crime suppression

In May 2019, Texas Governor Greg Abbott ordered the deployment of dozens of Highway Patrol troopers to South Dallas in response to a sharp rise in crime there. The troopers' responsibilities were to augment and assist the Dallas Police Department in order to reduce violent crime in south Dallas. In August 2019, Dallas Police reported a 29% reduction in violent crime in the areas where troopers were deployed, citing over 1,000 arrests and 12,500 traffic stops made by troopers. Some local politicians and Dallas residents, however, voiced concerns about the efficacy of the troopers' presence, and some critics argued that the crime reduction cited by Dallas Police was not as significant as that agency portrayed it to be. Some residents requested that troopers be withdrawn from Dallas entirely, or re-deployed to other parts of the city, complaining about the troopers' aggressive traffic enforcement in predominantly black and Latino neighborhoods. DPS claimed that its original agreement with Dallas Police was indeed to conduct primarily traffic enforcement, in order to allow Dallas officers to focus on combatting violent crime directly. The operation officially ended on September 1, 2019, although some South Dallas residents asked the Dallas Police Department in January 2020 about the possibility of troopers returning to the city, mainly in response to concerns about street racing and spontaneous gunfire.

Controversy stemming from the operation arose in August 2019 when two troopers assigned to patrol South Dallas fatally shot 27-year-old Schaston Hodge after a short pursuit. The troopers initially attempted to pull over Hodge for failing to signal a turn, but Hodge did not stop and led the troopers on a brief chase before pulling into his grandmother’s driveway. Body-worn camera footage released by the Texas DPS in January 2020 showed Hodge aiming a pistol at the troopers before being shot 16 times. The troopers attempted to render first aid to Hodge, but he did not survive. In November 2019, a grand jury declined to indict either trooper.

Statistics

General

 As of 2016, the Highway Patrol is made up of 2,863 commissioned troopers, up from 2,162 in 2014.
 Among 49 state police agencies nationwide, Texas has one of the lowest proportions of troopers to population of any state. With approximately 11 troopers per 100,000 residents, the Texas Highway Patrol falls well below the national average of 23 per 100,000.
 Texas DPS Academy Class A-2019 graduated 87 probationary troopers on August 9, 2019.
 Between 2017 and 2019, the Highway Patrol commissioned 746 new troopers in 8 academy sessions, of whom 274 (36%) were military veterans and 151 (20%) had prior law enforcement experience.

Activities

 Between 2001 and 2013, the Highway Patrol made 35,803,978 traffic stops, resulting in 12,846,418 citations and 20,983,777 warnings issued
 In 2016, troopers made 42,779 misdemeanor and 11,392 felony arrests statewide
 In 2018, troopers investigated 75,030 traffic accidents, accounting for roughly 14% of all accidents in the state

Uniforms 
Texas state troopers wear dark tan uniforms, known affectionately by troopers as "Texas Tan". Full-length pants with a blue stripe and red piping are worn at all times; epaulettes on the shirt are similarly patterned. A black patent leather gun belt is worn with a silver buckle, along with matching leather holsters and pouches. Badges are reminiscent of the Texas Rangers' famous "star-in-a-wheel" badge, though featuring a solid blue field behind the star. The badge number is prominently displayed in black in the center of the star. Shoulder patches, worn on either sleeve, are predominantly red in color and feature the Texas Highway Patrol crest.

Troopers' headwear is unique in that instead of the peaked caps or campaign hats popular with other agencies, cowboy hats are worn with the duty uniform. Felt hats are worn in colder weather and straw hats are worn in warmer weather. Dress uniforms are similar to the patrol uniform, with the addition of a blue tie, long-sleeved shirt and black cowboy boots. Dress for various ceremonial units adds white gloves, a white ascot, a black Sam Browne shoulder strap and a red shoulder cord.

Special Uniforms 
 Honor Guard: Long-sleeved dress uniform, plus dark blue jacket with tan epaulettes, black Sam Browne shoulder strap, red shoulder cord, and white gloves.
 Pipes and Drums: Long-sleeved shirt with white ascot, black glengarry, red-and-black tartan kilt, horsehair sporran, red-and-black hose, black shoes, and white spats.
 Special Response Team & Tactical Marine Unit: Drab green military-style blouse, cargo pants, and utility vest, and desert combat boots. Green helmet worn by SRT, baseball cap or boonie hat by TMU.
 Aircraft: Drab green flight suit with desert combat boots.
 Aircraft (Alternate): OCP-pattern military blouse and cargo pants, green utility vest (Tactical Flight Officers only), and desert combat boots.
 Bicycle Patrol: Black and royal blue high-performance shirt with "State Trooper" printed on the back in silver lettering. Worn with black bicycle shorts, athletic shoes, and a blue, white, and black bicycle helmet.

Troopers working in environments which might dirty the uniform (such as performing commercial vehicle inspections) or which require constant movement or exertion may wear an altered version of the patrol uniform. This variant replaces the slacks with tan cargo pants and features a baseball cap in lieu of the cowboy hat.

Previous Uniforms 

Early uniforms included a blue-grey blouse and brown pants, typically worn with black motorcycle boots. These uniforms also featured a bow tie and Sam Browne shoulder straps. Troopers of this era wore peaked caps and diamond-shaped badges, with a single patch worn on the left shoulder; until the current uniform was instituted, the patch was circular. This uniform style was used until early 1959, when the current uniform was adopted. Until about 1972, the uniform continued to feature a shoulder strap, only one shoulder patch, and a black necktie, which was worn at all times; in addition, the cowboy hat featured a much smaller brim than those currently worn, so that it somewhat resembled a bowler with a creased crown.

It was not until the mid-2000s that a standardized patch design was used for all members of the patrol. Prior to this change (which is today being slowly integrated into other Texas DPS divisions), differently colored patches identified whether a trooper worked in the highway patrol, driver's license, or license and weight (commercial vehicle) units. Red patches indicated highway patrol, blue indicated driver's license, and grey indicated license and weight. Troopers assigned to the state Capitol had their own unique blue patch depicting the capitol building in yellow.

Rank structure

Vehicles 

The Texas Highway Patrol uses a variety of vehicles for patrol and specialized services. Early patrol units were motorcycles, but these were phased out in the 1950s. Since then, four-wheeled vehicles have been used for all patrol purposes; one trooper is assigned to each unit.

Current patrol vehicles are painted black with a white hood. Traditionally, the roof pillars, roof and trunk were white, but this practice was stopped with newer vehicles. "Texas Department Public Safety" is printed on the front door over a brown silhouette of the state of Texas. Underneath, "Texas Highway Patrol" is written in white; "State Trooper" is written on the front quarter panel and on the trunk.

The Texas Highway Patrol also utilizes helicopters, armored personnel carriers, and marine craft for specialized functions, such as search and rescue, reconnaissance/intelligence, and border patrol. The Tactical Marine Division is the newest addition to the Highway Patrol, with the acquisition of six patrol vessels intended to police the Rio Grande and international lakes between the U.S. and Mexico. Several more boats are on order.

In 2012, the Texas DPS decided to begin replacing its aging fleet of Ford Crown Victorias with Dodge Chargers. A small number of Ford's Explorer-based Police Interceptor Utility vehicles were purchased for use mainly in the Texas Panhandle. As of 2019, the Highway Patrol fleet consists primarily of Chevrolet Tahoes and Ford Police Interceptor Utilities. Several Dodge Chargers and a few Ford Crown Victorias are still in use, though these units are being gradually retired.

Patrol Vehicles
 Ford Crown Victoria Police Interceptor
 Dodge Charger
 Chevrolet Tahoe
 Ford Police Interceptor Utility

Motorcycles
 BMW R1200RT-P (Austin only)

Helicopters
 14 Eurocopter AS350 (3 Hoist Equipped)
 1 Eurocopter EC-145 (Hoist Equipped)

Fixed-Wing Aircraft 
 2 Cessna 208 Caravan
 4 Cessna 206
 2 Pilatus PC-12
 1 King Air 350

Marine Craft

 Yellowfin Shallow Water Interceptor

S.R.T.
 LENCO BearCat
 Humvee

Recruiting
 Hummer
 Dodge Challenger

 Other Transportation
 Bicycles (Austin only)
 Horses (Austin only)

Equipment 
Prior to the SIG Sauer P226 chambered in .357 sig troopers carried the SIG Sauer P220 chambered in .45 auto or in 9mm.

In 2013, Texas DPS officials announced that they would be switching to the Smith & Wesson M&P, 9-millimeter handgun as the standard-issue sidearm for troopers, due to higher round capacity over the SIG Sauer. Troopers already issued .357 sidearms would be allowed to continue using them. However, the transition was suspended after recruits at the A-2014 class, the first to train with the new weapons, reported functional concerns about the guns after repeated firing.

In early 2015, the Texas Department of Public Safety completed the process of selecting a replacement for the SIG Sauer P226, selecting the SIG Sauer P320, a polymer-framed, striker-fired pistol chambered in 9-millimeter. The C-2015 recruit class was the first Texas DPS class to be issued and trained on the SIG Sauer P320 and, upon graduation in December 2015, became the first Troopers to carry this pistol in the field as a duty weapon. The 9-millimeter ammunition selected for the SIG Sauer P320 was the Hornady 135 grain + P FlexLock Critical Duty. Other Texas DPS divisions, such as Aircraft and Criminal Investigations, will transition to the P320 over time.

Additional weaponry includes the Bushmaster M4 Type Carbine and the Remington 870 12-gauge shotgun, which is currently being phased out for the Mossberg 590. All firearms are state property and may not be modified by the troopers to whom they are issued. Less-lethal weapons issued to troopers includes expandable straight batons, oleoresin capsicum spray, and Tasers.

Patrol cars are equipped with Panasonic Toughbook computer terminals and digital citation printers. Mounted lights are either the Whelen Freedom lightbar, in older units, or the Whelen Liberty lightbar, in newer units; the patrol's newest Chevrolet Tahoe patrol vehicles are equipped with Whelen Legacy lightbars. Four of the bar's eight forward-facing light modules are white "takedown" lights; these are supplemented by column-mounted LED spotlights in newer vehicles. Warning lights are also mounted on the rear deck. Primary light colors for all vehicles are red and blue.

Salary and Promotions 
As of fiscal year 2010, troopers were being paid almost 20% less than officers in many municipal police departments, according to a state-conducted audit. Consequently, increased salaries for troopers were approved for 2014 by the 2013 Texas legislative session.

Troopers are automatically upgraded to different trooper classes in four-year increments. Salary increases with each class, up to Trooper VI, at which point pay becomes and remains steady (barring promotion). Troopers are eligible for promotion to sergeant after four years of service. Promotion is based on availability and completion of a civil service exam, as well as experience and disciplinary history. After two years as a sergeant, troopers are eligible for promotion to lieutenant.

In September 2015, troopers received yet another sizable raise - an academy trainee makes more now than a 3-year trooper did a year prior.

Response to 2010 Audit 

Many changes to salaries and promotional requirements were made in response to a 10% drop in the number of troopers between 2004 and 2010, when an audit was conducted. The audit determined that Highway Patrol troopers were being paid far less annually than officers at many metropolitan police departments and sheriff's offices. The problem had been present for many years, but had gone unresolved because the Texas State Legislature sets state employee salary, not individual agencies. Additionally, state agencies had been asked to cut approximately 10% of their budgets between 2010 and 2012, making lawmakers hesitant to approve a larger budget for DPS. However, many legislators also feared that the decrease in size of the DPS, which was predicted to worsen, would result in a gradual lapse in quality of service. As a result, a 20% pay increase in the salary of most Texas DPS officials was approved in 2012. Additional legislative measures are intended to shield DPS from most future budget cuts.

In previous years, troopers who received promotions were typically required to move to fill available posts throughout the state. However, concurrent with the legislative decision to increase trooper pay, an internal decision was made by the Texas DPS to relax this method, allowing troopers to have more say in where they are stationed upon being promoted. The decision was based on a trend of troopers being required to live hours away from their families in order to prevent their spouses from having to leave steady employment.

DPS also made an effort to fill state trooper vacancies. Recruitment efforts were increased across the country, particularly focusing on military members preparing to leave active duty. Recruiters traveled as far as California, North Carolina, and Michigan in search of potential applicants.

Demographics

Sex Demographics as of 2016:

 Male: 95%
 Female: 5%

Fallen troopers

Since the establishment of the Texas Highway Patrol, 87 troopers and patrolmen have died in the line of duty.

The fallen Troopers are listed below:

All fallen Highway Patrol troopers are publicly honored at the Texas Peace Officers' Memorial in Austin, a memorial at the Texas Department of Public Safety headquarters, and by various memorial markers throughout the state.

Grapevine Slayings
The Grapevine Slayings were the murders of two Texas Highway Patrolmen on April 1, 1934 by members of the Barrow Gang, popularly known as Bonnie and Clyde.

Patrolmen Holloway Daniel "H.D." Murphy and Edward Bryan Wheeler, both stationed in Fort Worth, were on routine patrol on State Highway 114 in Grapevine when they noticed a car parked on intersecting Dove Road. Believing the vehicle's occupants were in need of assistance, the troopers approached the car. They were unaware that the car's occupants were Bonnie Parker, Clyde Barrow, and Henry Methvin, outlaws wanted in several states for a string of robberies, kidnappings, and murders - including those of multiple police officers - that began in 1932 and had brought the gang nationwide attention.

As the patrolmen approached the car, they were unexpectedly met with gunfire. Trooper Wheeler was struck first and was killed instantly, his service weapon still holstered. Upon witnessing the death of his colleague, Trooper Murphy, a recent academy graduate on one of his first patrols, attempted to retrieve a shotgun from his motorcycle. However, he was shot before he could load the weapon. A passing motorist witnessed the shooting and flagged down another trooper, who arrived to find Wheeler dead and Murphy in critical condition. Trooper Murphy died on his way to a hospital in Grapevine.

Aftermath

Although the Barrow Gang had enjoyed a romantic image among many Americans before the Grapevine shootings, their popularity waned rapidly in the wake of the killings. Much of the public outcry was fueled by exaggerated media coverage of the incident, featuring erroneous claims by purported witnesses, but the shooting is nonetheless often considered the incident which turned opinions predominantly against the Barrow Gang. Although Parker was said to have fired several shots at the troopers, including the fatal shot to Murphy, this report was later discredited. Henry Methvin, a recent prison escapee, ultimately admitted to firing the first shots, mistakenly believing Barrow wanted the troopers killed; it is believed Barrow's actual intention was to kidnap the troopers. Nevertheless, Parker's name was later included on an arrest warrant for murder, along with Barrow and Methvin, the latter listed as "John Doe".

Shortly after the Grapevine Slayings, a posse of Texas Rangers, Dallas County sheriff's deputies, and Bienville Parish, Louisiana sheriff's deputies ambushed and killed Parker and Barrow in Bienville Parish, near Shreveport. The posse's leader, Frank Hamer, was a retired Texas Ranger who had been hired by the Texas Department of Corrections to track down Bonnie and Clyde. In a deal with the officers, Henry Methvin and his family had agreed to betray Parker and Barrow and arrange an ambush.

Today, a monument stone marks the location where Troopers Murphy and Wheeler were killed on Dove Road in present-day Southlake.

Atascosa County Ambush 

The Atascosa County Ambush was a surprise attack outside of Pleasanton, Texas on the evening of October 12, 1999 which resulted in the deaths of Trooper Terry Wayne Miller and deputies Mark Stephenson and Thomas Monse, Jr. of the Atascosa County Sheriff's Department. An additional two officers who subsequently arrived on scene were met with a hail of gunfire and received non-life-threatening gunshot wounds.

The perpetrator, Jeremiah Justin Engleton, placed a phony 9-1-1 call on the night of October 12, 1999 from his residence, prompting Deputy Stephenson and Deputy Monse to respond. Upon their arrival, the two deputies were met with gunfire from a high-powered rifle fired by Engleton, who was hiding in a ditch across the street from his mobile home. Both deputies died on scene while radioing for assistance as they sat in their police cruiser. Engleton then retrieved a Glock .40-caliber semiautomatic service pistol from one of the slain deputies before returning to the ditch.

Trooper Terry Wayne Miller arrived on scene, discovered the two bodies of the deputies, radioed for assistance, and was shot and killed before he was able to remove his seatbelt. Moments later, two additional officers, Pleasanton Police Department Officer Louis Tudyk and retired U.S. Immigration and Naturalization Service agent Carl Fisher, arrived on scene and were met with a barrage of gunfire which resulted in both officers being struck in the arm. The two injured officers were saved by 56-year-old cattle rancher Wendell Munson who dodged bullets to assist them into his pickup truck before speeding off. As more law enforcement officers converged on the scene of the crime, Jeremiah Engleton turned the stolen police handgun on himself and committed suicide.

Several firearms were found on Jeremiah Engleton's body, including a Norinco SKS 7.62 x 39mm semiautomatic rifle, a Mossberg 12-gauge pump-action shotgun, a Ruger 9mm semiautomatic handgun, a Glock .40-caliber semiautomatic handgun, and a Lorcin .380-caliber semiautomatic handgun. Investigators also discovered a suicide note hidden in Engleton's right shoe. In the end, over 100 expended rifle and shotgun casings littered the ground around the bodies of three law enforcement officers and the gunman.

Aftermath

Shortly after the incident, it was discovered that Engleton's then-roommate, Kenneth Vodochodsky, was an accomplice in the purchasing of ammunition to carry out the ambush. Vodochodsky had posted Englton's bail the previous day for an arrest on an unrelated incident; the arresting officer was Thomas Monse, one of the first deputies slain in the ambush. The pair were seen making purchases at a gun shop just hours after Englton had been released from jail. Kenneth Vodochodsky was subsequently arrested on October 15, 1999 and pleaded guilty to two counts of murder. He was initially sentenced to death on March 2, 2001 for his role in the triple murder. The conviction was later appealed and he was sentenced to 30 years in prison under a plea agreement. Kenneth Vodochodsky was denied parole in 2015 and again in 2020.

See also

 Davis class patrol boat
 List of law enforcement agencies in Texas
 State police
 State patrol
 Highway patrol

References

External links
 Texas Highway Patrol (Official Website)
 Texas Primer: The Resistol Hat - Texas Monthly

Organizations based in Austin, Texas
Texas Department of Public Safety
1929 establishments in Texas